Mtsangadoua is a village in the commune of Acoua on Mayotte.

Populated places in Mayotte